The March 1987 Turkish incursion into northern Iraq, by the Turkish Air Force, began on 4 March 1987, when the Turkish Military bombed Kurdistan Workers' Party (PKK) targets in northern Iraq. 30 war planes were used in the operation and 3 major PKK camps (codenamed Sırat, Era and Alamış by Turkey) was bombed.

References 

Kurdish–Turkish conflict (1978–present)
History of the Kurdistan Workers' Party
Conflicts in 1987
1987 in Iraqi Kurdistan
1987 in Iraq
1987 in Turkey
Cross-border operations of Turkey into Iraq